"It Started with a Love Affair" is a 1989 song first performed by Swedish singer Jerry Williams. The song was written by Norell Oson Bard.

Chart performance 
The song charted for three weeks (from June 10–24, 1989) on the Swedish Trackslistan and peaked at number seven in its final week before the summer hiatus.

Covers 
A Swedish version, with lyrics by Keith Almgren, called "En kärleksaffär" (eng. "A Love Affair") has been recorded by Mats Rådberg & Rankarna and later by Matz Bladhs (1991 on the album Leende dansmusik 91).

References

1989 songs
Swedish pop songs
Songs written by Alexander Bard
Songs written by Tim Norell
Songs written by Ola Håkansson
English-language Swedish songs
Jerry Williams (singer) songs
Matz Bladhs songs